Club de Gimnasia y Tiro is an Argentine football club, based in the city of Salta. The team currently plays in Torneo Argentino A, the regionalised third division of the Argentine football league system.

Gimnasia y Tiro has played four seasons at the highest level of Argentine football. First came in 1979 and 1981 Nacional championships. Gimnasia finished bottom of their group in 1979 and 6th of 7 teams in 1981. The third season was in 1993/1994. The fourth season was in 1997/98 when the squad promoted to the Argentine Primera División but after finishing 20th (last) in the Apertura and 17th in the Clausura tournaments respectively, Gimnasia was relegated at the end of the season.

Current squad
As of 2014–15 season

External links

El Gigante de Salta 
Unofficial page 
Albo Mi Vida 
Gimnasia blog 
Club's rugby union page 

 
Football clubs in Salta Province
Salta
Association football clubs established in 1902
Argentine field hockey clubs
Argentine rugby union teams
1902 establishments in Argentina